C75 may refer to :
 Boeing C-75, a 1942 military aircraft
 Ruy Lopez chess openings ECO code
 Malignant neoplasm of other endocrine glands and related structures ICD-10 code
 Continental C75, an engine
 Caldwell 75 (NGC 6124), an open cluster in the constellation Scorpius